Pigeonhed is the eponymously titled debut studio album of Pigeonhed, released on December 20, 1993 through Sub Pop.

Track listing

Accolades

Personnel
Pigeonhed
Steve Fisk – instruments
Shawn Smith – vocals

Additional musicians
Kim Thayil – guitar

Production
Arthur S. Aubry – photography
Art Chantry – design
Bruce Pavitt – production
Pigeonhed – production, mixing
Jonathan Poneman – production

References

External links
 

1993 debut albums
Pigeonhed albums
Sub Pop albums